Krutoye is a rural locality (a selo) in Lemeshkinskoye Rural Settlement, Rudnyansky District, Volgograd Oblast, Russia. The population was 8 as of 2010. There is 1 street.

Geography 
Krutoye is located in steppe, on the Khopyorsko-Buzulukskaya Plain, 19 km west of Rudnya (the district's administrative centre) by road. Ilmen is the nearest rural locality.

References 

Rural localities in Rudnyansky District, Volgograd Oblast